The Mui is a river of southern Ethiopia.

See also 
 List of rivers of Ethiopia

Omo River (Ethiopia)
Rivers of Ethiopia